Vanessa K. Valdés is an author, educator, writer, editor, historian, and associate professor of Spanish and Portuguese at the City College of New York. She is a Puerto Rican of African descent. She is the author of Diasporic Blackness: The Life and Times of Arturo Alfonso Schomburg. Schomburg was one of the founding fathers of Black History in North America, and the father of the Global African Diaspora. She has also written Oshun's Daughters: The Search for Womanhood in the Americas. In Oshun's Daughters she examines African Diasporic sense of womanhood, examining novels, poems, etc., written by Diaspora women from the United States, the Caribbean, and Brazil. Writings that show how these women use traditional Yoruba religion as alternative models for their womanhood differing from western concepts of being a woman.

She is an editor of Let Spirit Speak, Cultural Journeys through the African Diaspora, and the Future is Now: A New Look at African Diaspora Studies. Her articles have appeared in various journals such as; Chasqui, Hispania, MELUS Journal, CLA Journal, Callaloo, and The Journal (PALARA).

Her research is in comparative studies in literature of the Americans and particularly the Afro-Hispanic, African-American, Spanish Caribbean, U.S. Latina/Latino, and history of Puerto Rico.

Early life
Vanessa says that her passion for reading started at an early age from her parents. She would imitate her father, and that her New York city apartment was filled with books and encyclopedias. Her undergraduate degree in English taught her the works of Chaucer, Donne, Milton, and Shakespeare. She later became exposed to the writings of Zora Neal Hurston, Richard Wright, Toni Morrison, and Langston Hughes.

While in college her last year in college she was exposed to 'Down These Mean Streets', that was written by Piri Thomas. She says that this book changed her life.

Career

2013 - A panelist for the 20th anniversary of Africana Studies at Barnard College, the Africana Studies Program, the Consortium for Critical Interdisciplinary Studies, and the Barnard Center for Research on Women. The two day conference was called  The Worlds of Shange Conference. The featured panelist were Farah Griffin, Alexis Pauline Gumbs, Jennifer DeVere Brody, and the moderator was Monica L. Miller. The conference was a discussion about the works of Ntozake Shange's work.

Books by Vanessa K. Valdes
2017 - Diasporic Blackness: The Life and Times of Arturo Alfonso Schomburg published by SUNY Press. She examines the life of Black Puerto Rican born scholar Arturo Alfonso Schomburg. Who was born in 1874 and died in 1938. Schomburg is known for his collection and research of African Diaspora history. His personal library became the basis for the Schomburg Center in New York City in Harlem.
 2014 - Oshun's Daughters: The Search for Womanhood in the Americas, published by SUNY Press
 2012 - The Future is Now: A New Look at African Diaspora Studies, published by Cambridge Scholars Publishing
 2012 - Let Spirit Speak! Cultural Journeys through the African Diaspora published by SUNY Press

References

External links
 Worlds of Shange Panel I: From Analphabetic to Script Obsessed
 KAZI Book Review with Hopeton Hay, KAZI 88.7FM, Austin, TX
Vanessa K. Valdés, book review NPR Podcast

Living people
American essayists
American women novelists
21st-century American historians
Historians of the United States
Puerto Rican writers
Afro-Latino culture in the United States
Writers from the Bronx
Novelists from New York (state)
Historians from New York (state)
21st-century American women writers
American women historians
Year of birth missing (living people)